Raymond H. "Hap" Spuhler Field is a baseball venue in Fairfax, Virginia, United States. It is home to the George Mason Patriots baseball team of the NCAA Division I Atlantic 10 Conference. Opened in 1986, it has a capacity of 900 spectators. It is named for Raymond H. "Hap" Spuhler, the first head coach of George Mason's baseball program.

History 
Spuhler Field was opened in 1986. Prior to its opening, George Mason baseball used several area venues as temporary home fields.

The field received several awards in the early 2000s for the quality of its playing surface. In 1999–2000, the Beam Clay College Baseball Diamond of the Year Award ranked Spuhler Field third, and in 2000–2001, it ranked the field second. In 2002, the Sports Turf Managers Association awarded the field the college and university division's Baseball Field of the Year Award. In 2003, the field's playing surface was renovated. A Bermuda turf grass surface replaced the field's bluegrass/rye mixture. In addition, a new drainage system and artificial turf collar around home plate were installed.

Features 
Features of the field include dugouts, bullpens, a sprinkler system, a batting cage, and an electronic scoreboard. A practice infield lies adjacent to the field on the first base side.

See also 
 List of NCAA Division I baseball venues

References 

College baseball venues in the United States
Baseball venues in Virginia
George Mason Patriots baseball
Buildings and structures in Fairfax, Virginia
1986 establishments in Virginia
Sports venues completed in 1986
Sports venues in the Washington metropolitan area
Sports in Fairfax, Virginia